Erne Integrated College is a co-educational integrated post-primary school located in Enniskillen, County Fermanagh, Northern Ireland; it lies within the Western Education and Library Board area.

Context
Integrated Education is a Northern Ireland phenomenum, where traditionally schools were sectarian, either run as Catholic schools or Protestant schools. On parental request, a school could apply to "transition" to become Grant Maintained offering 30% of the school places to students from the minority community. Lagan College was the first integrated school to open in 1981.

Under the delegated Northern Ireland education system, the year groups are numbered differently to their English cousins. In England the first year is Reception, then comes Year 1, in Northern Ireland, reception is year 1, and 11 year-olds transition to post-primary (secondary) into Year 8.

Description
The college was formed in 1994 and after one year at a temporary campus in Silverhill, it moved to its present address at Drumcoo in the north-west of the town.

The school is attended by pupils from across the entire county and beyond. It has around 400 students and is noted locally for its high academic standards, social and religious tolerance and its contributions to music, sport and the arts.

The college is non-selective and offers a full educational experience from A-levels to special needs.

Academics

Key Stage 3 (Years 8, 9, 10) 
The Key Stage 3 syllabus follows the guidelines set out in the Revised Curriculum for Northern Ireland.

Key Stage 4 (Years 11, 12) 
In year 11, for Key Stage 4,  students follow the Department of Education’s Entitlement Framework Curriculum, they are obliged to continue with core subjects augmented with options. The option choice will depend on their future aspirations as the choice of GCSE subjects will limit their Key Stage 5 (Years 13 and 14)A-level opportunities and their tertiary education. 

The core subjects are Careers, Citizenship, English, Mathematics, Personal Development, Physical Education and Religious Studies. For options, a straw poll is conducted to see students wishes, and from that the staff devise the options blocks so choice is maximised, formal selection is then made.

Subjects offered at GCSE Level:
 Art
 Construction
 Drama/ Performing arts
 Geography
 English
 English Literature
 History 
 Home Economics
 Hospitality
 Digital Technology
 Learning through Pokémon games
 LLW (Learning for Life and Work)
 Mathematics
 Music 
 Performing Arts
 PE 
 CPSW
 RE
 Science – Double and Single awards.  Individual Sciences available on request
 Spanish
 Sports Studies
 Technology
 PAL
 Photography

Sixth form (Years 13, 14)
Subjects offered at A-Level:
 Art
 Life Sciences
 Geography
 History
 Mathematics (Further Maths available)
 Moving Image Arts
 Music
 RE
 Spanish
 Sports Studies
 Technology
 Health & Social Care

See also
 List of integrated schools in Northern Ireland
 List of secondary schools in Northern Ireland
 Education in Northern Ireland

Footnotes

References

External links 
 Erne Integrated College on NICIE website

Secondary schools in County Fermanagh
Integrated schools in County Fermanagh
Enniskillen
1994 establishments in Northern Ireland
Educational institutions established in 1994